Olga Valeryevna Danilova (Russian: Ольга Валерьевна Данилова; born 10 June 1970 in Bugulma, Tatar ASSR, Russian SFSR) is a Russian cross-country skier who competed from 1991 until she was banned for using performance-enhancing drugs in 2002.

Career
Her statistics are listed as height: , weight: .

Danilova won a total of eleven medals at the FIS Nordic World Ski Championships, including four golds (4 × 5 km relay: 1995, 1997, 1999, 2001), four silvers (5 km: 1999, 10 km: 2001, 15 km: 2001, 30 km: 1999), and three bronzes (5 km + 10 km combined pursuit: 1995, 5 km: 1997, 5 km + 5 km combined pursuit: 2001). She also won the 30 km event at the Holmenkollen ski festival in 2000.

In 1992, Danilova made her Olympic debut. She won three medals at the 1998 Winter Olympics in Nagano, with a gold in the 15 km classical and the 4 × 5 km relay, and a silver in the 5 km + 10 km combined pursuit.

In 2002, she again participated in the cross-country skiing events at the 2002 Winter Olympics. Danilova won two medals with a gold in the 5 km + 5 km combined pursuit and a silver in the 10 km classical. However, she was one of three cross-country skiers (together with Johann Mühlegg and Larisa Lazutina) who were disqualified after blood tests indicated the use of darbepoetin, a drug intended to boost red blood cell production.

In February 2004, the International Olympic Committee stripped Danilova's 2002 Olympic medals following a Court of Arbitration for Sport ruling in December 2003. The results were amended accordingly. As a result of the use of the banned substance, Olga Danilova received a two-year ban by the International Ski Federation in 2002.

Cross-country skiing results
All results are sourced from the International Ski Federation (FIS).

Olympic Games
 3 medals – (2 gold, 1 silver)

World Championships
 11 medals – (4 gold, 4 silver, 3 bronze)

a.  Cancelled due to extremely cold weather.

World Cup

Season standings

Individual podiums
4 victories 
18 podiums

Team podiums
 20 victories – (20 ) 
 26 podiums – (25 , 1 )

Note:  Until the 1999 World Championships, World Championship races were included in the World Cup scoring system.

See also
 List of sportspeople sanctioned for doping offences

References

External links
 
 Holmenkollen winners since 1892 – click Vinnere for downloadable pdf file 
 IOC Executive Board disqualifies Muehlegg and Danilova from the Salt Lake City Games — IOC press release, 28 February 2004.
 
 

1970 births
Living people
People from Bugulma
Cross-country skiers at the 1992 Winter Olympics
Cross-country skiers at the 1998 Winter Olympics
Cross-country skiers at the 2002 Winter Olympics
Doping cases in cross-country skiing
Holmenkollen Ski Festival winners
Olympic gold medalists for Russia
Olympic silver medalists for Russia
Olympic cross-country skiers of the Unified Team
Olympic cross-country skiers of Russia
Russian female cross-country skiers
Olympic medalists in cross-country skiing
Competitors stripped of Winter Olympics medals
Russian sportspeople in doping cases
FIS Nordic World Ski Championships medalists in cross-country skiing
Medalists at the 1998 Winter Olympics
Sportspeople from Tatarstan
21st-century Russian women